Chachopali is a small village/hamlet in the Goriakothi block of the Siwan district in Indian state of Bihar. It comes under Chachopali Panchayath and is part of Saran Division. It is located at a distance of 17 km from the city of Siwan and 120 km from the state capital Patna.Chachopali PIN code is 841506. Chachopali is surrounded by the Sidhwaliya block on the north, the Basantpur block on the south, the Lakri Nabiganj block on the east, and the Barauli block on the North.

Nearest airports

 Kushinagar Airport, Kushinagar
 Lok Nayak Jayaprakash Airport, Patna

References

Villages in Siwan district